FK Hajduk Kula (Serbian Cyrillic: ФК Хајдук Кула) was a Serbian football club based in Kula. The club was named after a Hajduk, a much celebrated hero figure in the Serbian epic poetry. On 30 July 2013, just eleven days before start of new season it was announced that club resigned from the SuperLiga and dissolved its first team due to financial problems, while the youth teams continue to participate in competitions in the club's successor OFK Hajduk.

It was planned that the first new OFK Hajduk team would start in the 2014–15 season in the 3rd League. OFK Hajduk is using FK Hajduk's symbols stadium, auxiliary fields, and has complete FK Hajduk's management, youth squads and PR service. In August 2013, a group of citizens founded a separate football club called is FK Hajduk Kula 1925, which registered in March 2014.

In summer 2015, the club residence moved to Novi Sad.

Beside the story of the former club, a club named Hajduk Junior had also founded in Kula and started playing competitive matches since summer 2015. In the mid of the 2017–18 season, the club replaced OFK Odžaci in the Serbian League Vojvodina, and formally played under the name of that club until the end of season. The club also uses Stadion Milan Sredanović as a home ground.

History

Beginning: KAFK
The first registered football club in Kula was the KAFK (Kulski atletski fudbalski klub, Kula athletic football club) in 1912. In 1920, already within the Kingdom of Serbs, Croats and Slovenes, the club is incorporated in the league of the sub-association of Subotica. Ferenc Plattkó was the coach and one of the most notable player from that period. In 1925, a fraction of the club is named SK Hajduk (Sportski klub Hajduk, Sports club Hajduk) and in 1926 what was left of KAFK becomes Radnički which will be renamed in 1938 to JSK (Jugoslovenski sportski klub, Yugoslavian sport club). During the 1930s, the club never archived the level from the earlier decade and by the beginning of the Second World War it was disbanded.

SK Hajduk
SK Hajduk played its first match in 1925 against SK Rusin from Ruski Krstur. In opposition to KAFK which was mostly formed and supported by the local German community, Hajduk was known for his multi-cultural element. The club started competing in the third league of the Subotica sub-association and progressively achieved promotions, in 1929 to the second, and 1933 to the first league of Subotica sub-association. With the beginning of the Second World War and the subsequent occupation of the Kingdom of Yugoslavia, the club is disbanded in 1941 by the German authorities. Still during the war, the club was allowed to restore activities however with the condition of changing the name, so it existed as Ifjusag (meaning Youth in Hungarian) but only played friendly matches against neighbouring local teams. A number of club officials, players and supporters joined resistance against the Axis occupation and died during the war.

1945–1991
After the war the club competes locally under several different names, Udarnik, Bratstvo-Jedinstvo and Jedinstvo, restoring the old name only in 1949. It was that same year that Hajduk achieved promotion to the regional Vojvodina League. It is in this period that the handball, volleyball, boxing, bowling, tennis, and other sections, are created within the club. In 1955–56, it finishes top achieving promotion to the III Zone which was one of the 5 subdivisions of the Yugoslav Second League. In the first season in this rang the club finished 5th. After some league restructuring Hajduk will achieve promotion to the Yugoslav Second League North in 1970 in their third consecutive attempt. The club stayed in this level 3 seasons after which it was relegated to the regional Vojvodina League where it will play during the following 15 years, with exception of the period 1983–85 when it played in the Bačka zone league. The clubs ascension begins in the 1988–89 season when they fail promotion to the Yugoslav Third League in the last round. However, they will achieve the promotion a year later by finishing top in their league. In the next season they finish third and achieve promotion to the Yugoslav Second League. This period will be crowned with the promotion to the 1991–92 Yugoslav First League.

1991–2013
After achieving the promotion to the national top league in 1991, Hajduk will never be relegated until nowadays, a feature archived only by the biggest clubs: Red Star, Partizan and Vojvodina.

In the early 1990s, the club invests in the infrastructure with the building of the necessary sports facilities and a modern stadium. The Yugoslav Wars and the sanctions imposed to FR Yugoslavia made this development more difficult, however the club archived the necessary sport results to become a solid member of the First League of FR Yugoslavia. Major help in this period came from a local company Rodić M&B who became the general sponsor since 1992, and the club changes its name into FK Hajduk Rodić M&B – Kula.

The club becomes an important social player in the region, helping numerous local clubs in difficult times and making numerous humanitarian aid relief activities. A number of club associates participated and helped local Serbian population in Bosnia and Croatia during the wars. At sports level, the club, in its 5th top league season 1996–97, and despite predictions of relegation, achieved their best ever result, as they finished the season 4th. This way they earned a place in the 1997 UEFA Intertoto Cup.

In the following seasons the club stabilized in the middle of the table in the league, and more was invested in the improvement of the infrastructure. Hajduk also created their satellite club, Lipar MB, becoming the only club in the country beside Partizan to have one. A number of club players became notable. The top scorer in the club's history is Dejan Osmanović with 91 goals. He was also the top scorer of the Yugoslav First League in the 1998–99 season. Mirko Radulović has the most appearances in a single season in the club's history with 35 games in the 1995–96 season.

While playing for the club, goalkeeper Nikola Milojević was part of the Serbia and Montenegro U-21 team which won silver at the 2004 UEFA European Under-21 Championship and was also member of the Serbia and Montenegro team at the 2004 Olympics. The most goals scored by the club in a single season was 45 in 2000–01. The largest win in the top league was in 2000 when Hajduk beat Sutjeska Nikšić 6–2.

In 2005, Rodić M&B abandoned its sponsorship  becoming just a donor, marking a period of financial recession for the club. The satellite club, which had been renamed POFK Kula earlier, is merged with Radnički Sombor helping this was the Sombor club from being relegated. However, with the sacrifices done by all members of the club, Hajduk finishes the 2005–06 Serbia and Montenegro SuperLiga in 4th place qualifying that way to the 2006–07 UEFA Cup where they were eliminated in the second qualifying round by CSKA Sofia on away goals rule after a 1–1 draw at home.

In the 2006–07 Serbian SuperLiga they finished 5th, and this way earning a spot at the 2007 UEFA Intertoto Cup. In that season the club was coached by Žarko Soldo who marked the club and achieved some memorable results as a win over Partizan by 3–0 with goals of Milan Perić, twice, and Ljubomir Fejsa, the later setting the record transfer between SuperLiga clubs when moved from Hajduk to Partizan by €1.2 million. In the 2007 Intertoto Cup, Hajduk won Slovenian NK Maribor by 5–2 aggregate (5–0, 0–2) but in the finals they lost against Portuguese União de Leiria and failed to qualify to the UEFA Cup.

After a season 2010–11 in which they barely escaped from relegation, the club under a new leadership under the President Zoran Osmajić, started the season 2011–12 with 4 straight wins becoming the unexpected leaders in the 5th round. It was then that two difficult matches came, against current champions Partizan followed by their rivals Red Star, and Hajduk lost both, 0–2 and 0–1 respectively. On 28 September 2011, the former manager Nebojša Vignjević was replaced by Petar Kurćubić.

On 30 July 2013, just eleven days before start of new season it was announced that club resigned from the SuperLiga and dissolved its first team due to financial problems, while the youth teams continue to participate in competitions in OFK Hajduk. It was planned that OFK Hajduk would be the new first team to start in the 2014–15 season in the 3rd League.

Supporters
Hajduk Kula's organized supporters was known as Zulu iz Kulu. This group was founded in the end of the 1980s, but in the spring of 1998, the group broke up. In the spring of 2005, new generation of Hajduk fans tried to renew the group, but without any success.

Hajduk Kula in European competitions

 QR2 = 2nd Qualifying Round
 R2 = 2nd round
 R3 = 3rd round

Notable former players
To appear in this section a player must have either:
 Played at least 80 games for the club.
 Set a club record or won an individual award while at the club.
 Played at least one international match for their national team at any time.

  Aleksandar Bratić
  Miroslav Čovilo
  Faruk Hujdurović
  Aleksandar Jovanović
  Ninoslav Milenković
  Siniša Peulić
  Zoran Rajović
  Ferenc Plattkó
  József Schaller
  Nenad Brnović
  Filip Kasalica
  Savo Pavićević
  Niša Saveljić
  Zoran Vuksanović
  Zoran Antić
  Nikola Bogić
  Radoš Bulatović
  Ivan Ćirka
  Aleksandar Davidov
  Milan Davidov
  Ranko Delić
  Anđelko Đuričić
  Darko Fejsa
  Ljubomir Fejsa
  Željko Karanović
  Dejan Kekezović
  Nikola Komazec
  Igor Kozoš
  Nikola Malbaša
  Nikola Milojević
  Dragan Mojić
  Dejan Osmanović
  Siniša Radanović
  Dejan Rađenović
  Jovan Radivojević
  Mirko Radulović
  Uroš Stamatović
  Dragan Stojisavljević
  Đorđe Tomić

For the list of all current and former players with Wikipedia article, please see: :Category:FK Hajduk Kula players.

Coaching history
This is a list of all Hajduk Kula managers:

 Milan Milanović
 Veličko Kaplanović (June 2012– ?)
 Zoltan Sabo (Dec 2011 – May 2012)
 Petar Kurćubić (Sept 2011 – Dec 2011)
 Nebojša Vignjević (July 2011 – Sept 2011)
 Dragoljub Bekvalac (Sept 2010 – June 2011)
 Zdenko Glumac (Aug 2010 – Sept 2010)
 Žarko Soldo (Dec 2009 – June 2010)
 Bogdan Korak (July 2009 – Dec 2009)
 Radmilo Jovanović (July 2008 – June 2009)
 Miroslav Vukašinović (Nov 2007 – June 2008)
 Nebojša Vučićević
 Boris Bunjak
 Miloljub Ostojić
 Slavenko Kuzeljević
 Momčilo Raičević
 Miroslav Vukašinović
 Dragoljub Bekvalac
 Nikola Rakojević
 Željko Jurčić
 Nenad Starovlah
 Milorad Sekulović
 Milan Sredanović
 Miloš Cetina
 Žarko Bulatović
 Joakim Vislavski
 Ilija Tojagić
 Veliša Popović
 Luka Malešev
 Đorđe Jovanić
 Miodrag Vlaški
 Božidar Koloković
 Nikola Josić
 Đorđe Belogrlić
 Edo Plac
 Gradimir Bogojevac
 Ivan Savković
 Vilmoš Gemeri
 Mirko Juhas
 Stevan Pejčić
 József Treml
 Slobodan Anđelković
 Petar Rujer
 Uroš Ćirić
 Gojko Obradov
 Sava Prekajac
 Stevan Ćirić
 Sima Šuvakov
 Pera Struklić
 János Katatics
 Ljubomir Rankov
 Géza Knefély
 Laslo Egeto
 Ferenc Plattkó
 Oto Knezi
 Jožef Sep

References

External links
FK Hajduk Kula at Srpskistadioni.in.rs
Rastali se kulski Hajduk i Soldo, MTSMondo, 1 October 2007
Vukašinović na klupi Kuljana, MTSMondo, 2 November 2007

 
Defunct football clubs in Serbia
Football clubs in Vojvodina
Association football clubs established in 1925
2013 disestablishments in Serbia
1925 establishments in Serbia
Association football clubs disestablished in 2013